The 1979 season of 1. deild karla was the 25th season of second-tier football in Iceland.

Standings

Top scorers

References
 

1. deild karla (football) seasons
Iceland
Iceland
2